Claire Dizon Strauss (1928 – June 15, 2020) professionally known as Lilia Dizon was a Filipina actress active in the 1940s and 1950s.

Personal life
She was the only daughter of Regina Dizon, a Filipino, and Abraham "Abe" Strauss, an American of German Jewish descent.

At the age of 15, she and her mother relocated to Manila from Baguio following the Second World War after her father left for America and then, she started performing in the theater under the name "Carol Strauss".

She was the wife of LVN Pictures actor Gil de León, with whom she had three children who would each eventually become actors as well: Pinky de Leon, Christopher de Leon and Melissa de Leon. She had a second husband, Antonio V. Abad with whom she had two daughters Toni Abad and Cori Abad. She retired from showbiz during the 1980s.

Death
Dizon died on June 15, 2020 at the age of 92 to complications due to metastatic lung cancer.

Selected filmography

1946 - Probinsiyana
1947 - Bakya mo Neneng
1947 - Kamagong
1947 - Binatang Maynila
1947 - Pangarap ko'y Ikaw Rin
1947 - Violeta
1947 - Ina
1948 - Engkantada
1948 - Kaaway ng Babae
1948 - Kambal na Ligaya
1948 - Krus na Bituin
1948 - Perfidia
1948 - Maestro Pajarillo
1949 - Makabagong Pilipina
1950 - Magkumpareng Putik
1950 - Tininti del Barrio
1950 - Sohrab at Rustum
1951 - Pulo ng Engkantada
1951 - Venus
1951 - Dugo sa Dugo
1951 - Haring Cobra
1952 - Bathaluman
1953 - Itinakwil
1953 - Kuwintas ng Pasakit
1953 - Sa Paanan ng Bundok
1953 - Makabuhay
1954 - Tucydides
1954 - Doce Pares
1954 - Ikaw ang Buhay Ko
1954 - Kandilerong Pilak
1955 - Sanda Wong
1956 - Simaron
1956 - Umaalong Ginto
1957 - Kandilang Bakal
1958 - Glory at Dawn
1958 - Sisang Tabak
1961 - The Moises Padilla Story
1974 - Tinimbang Ka Nguni't Kulang (Weighed But Found Wanting)

References

External links

1928 births
2020 deaths
Filipino people of American descent
Filipino people of German-Jewish descent
Filipino emigrants to the United States
Filipino child actresses
Lilia
Actresses from Pampanga
20th-century Filipino actresses